Alex Gashaza (born August 20, 1967) is a Tanzanian politician and a member of the Chama Cha Mapinduzi political party. He was elected MP representing Ngara in 2015.

References 

Living people
1967 births
Chama Cha Mapinduzi politicians
Tanzanian MPs 2015–2020